Living Eyes may refer to:
Living Eyes (Radio Birdman album), 1981
Living Eyes (Bee Gees album), 1981
"Living Eyes" (song), a single by the Bee Gees from the album of the same name